Alonsoa meridionalis (syn. Alonsoa grandiflora, Alonsoa incisifolia and Alonsoa warscewiczii), is an ornamental plant in the family Scrophulariaceae.

References

External links

Alonsoa grandiflora picture

Scrophulariaceae